The Electronic Entertainment Expo 2016 (E3 2016) was the 22nd E3, during which several hardware manufacturers and software developers and publishers from the video game industry presented new and upcoming products to the attendees, primarily retailers and  members of the video game press. The event, organized by the Entertainment Software Association, took place at the Los Angeles Convention Center from June 14–16, 2016. Approximately 50,300 people attended the event, slightly down from the previous year's. With video game consoles currently a couple years into their 8th generation, the focus of E3 2016 was primarily on new software titles, with new hardware revisions and auxiliary equipment to support the growing market sectors of 4K resolution displays and virtual reality headsets.

The Expo started two days after the mass shooting at an Orlando, Florida nightclub. It was also three days after the murder of Christina Grimmie, who was a big Zelda fan and was scheduled to make an appearance at the expo. To show support for victims of the tragedy, the exhibitors at the Expo made changes to their presentations and plans. Flags outside the Convention Center were lowered to half-mast. Bethesda and Nintendo wore rainbow-colored ribbon pins during their press conferences in support of the victims, Microsoft and Nintendo opened their presentations with a moment of silence for Grimmie and the other victims. Sony's Chairman Shawn Layden started his presentation with a brief speech on the Orlando shooting and Nintendo president, Reggie Fils-Aimé, gave his condolences to Grimmie's family and fans before starting his keynote speech. Other developers planned to alter their approach to social media announcements during the Expo to avoid statements that would be counter to the current national mood after the event.

Press conferences

Square Enix
Square Enix hosted a Deus Ex Universe pre-E3 press conference on June 8 at 8:30 a.m. During the conference, a 17-minute demo for Deus Ex: Mankind Divided was shown along with a new game mode called Breach, as well as the 3rd game in the Square Enix Go franchise, Deus Ex Go.

Electronic Arts
Electronic Arts hosted its press conference on June 12 at 1:00 p.m. as part of their own EA Play event. During the conference, EA showed two new trailers for Titanfall 2, gameplay of Battlefield 1, a behind-the-scenes look at Mass Effect: Andromeda and updates on upcoming Star Wars games from EA. The game company also revealed a teaser trailer for Madden NFL 17, a new game mode for FIFA 17, and a new project called EA Originals, which will help to publish titles created by indie developers, with the first such title being Fe.

Bethesda
Bethesda hosted its second press conference on June 12 at 7:00 p.m. During the conference, a remaster of The Elder Scrolls V: Skyrim was revealed, along with new DLC content and VR versions for The Elder Scrolls Online, Doom and Fallout 4 and an intro for The Elder Scrolls: Legends. Trailers, gameplay, and release windows were shown for Prey, Quake Champions and Dishonored 2.

Microsoft
Microsoft hosted a press conference on June 13 at 9:30 a.m. During the conference, Microsoft unveiled the Xbox One S—a new revision of the original Xbox One model with a smaller form factor and 4K video support (released August 2016), and teased "Project Scorpio"—later named Xbox One X, a higher-end version of the console scheduled for 2017. New trailers were shown for Gears of War 4, Halo Wars 2, Inside, Tekken 7, Killer Instinct, ReCore, Scalebound and Sea of Thieves, along with reveals of Dead Rising 4, State of Decay 2 and Forza Horizon 3. Additional announcements were made for new Xbox Live functionality, the Xbox Play Anywhere program that would allow users to play purchased supported Xbox One games on their Windows 10 computers without having to re-purchase the game and enable cross-platform play capabilities between the two platforms, and an Elite Wireless Controller themed to Gears of War 4, as well as the reveal of Xbox Design Lab and a demo for Final Fantasy XV.

PC Gaming Show
PC Gamer hosted the second PC Gaming Show on June 13 at 12:00 p.m. AMD announced two new graphic processor cards for PC gaming, and demonstrated a prototype wearable VR unit using an Alienware system with an AMD graphics card worn on a person's back. Warren Spector gave a short lecture appreciating the keyboard-and-mouse control schemes common to many PC games. Approximately twenty PC games were featured in the show, including expansions for Ark: Survival Evolved, Killing Floor 2, and Superhot and new games including Lawbreakers, Overland, The Turing Test, Dual Universe, Oxygen Not Included, Giant Cop, Mount & Blade II: Bannerlord, The Surge, Warhammer 40,000: Dawn of War III, and Vampyr.

Ubisoft
Ubisoft hosted a press conference on June 13 at 1:00 p.m. During the conference, new trailers and dates were shown for For Honor, Tom Clancy's Ghost Recon: Wildlands and South Park: The Fractured but Whole, along with demos of Watch Dogs 2 and Eagle Flight. Ubisoft also released the behind-the-scene footage of the Assassin's Creed movie, along with the reveals of Steep, Trials of the Blood Dragon, Grow Up, and Star Trek: Bridge Crew.

Sony
Sony Interactive Entertainment hosted a press conference on June 13 at 6:00 p.m. Sony announced the cost and release date of the PlayStation VR headset on October 13, 2016, with fifty games to be supported at launch; additional VR games announced included Batman: Arkham VR, Star Wars: Battlefront X-Wing VR, and Farpoint. Sony announced the release date for the long-awaited The Last Guardian for October 25, 2016, and a planned remastering of the first three Crash Bandicoot games. New games announced included a new God of War, Resident Evil 7, Death Stranding, Days Gone, and a new yet-untitled Spider-Man game to be developed by Insomniac Games.

Nintendo
Nintendo, continuing a precedence set at the previous three expos, decided to forego hosting either a traditional press conference or announcement video in favor of two separate day-long Treehouse Live shows. The first broadcast on June 14 was dedicated to the full reveal of The Legend of Zelda: Breath of the Wild and Pokémon Sun and Moon. The second broadcast on June 15 covered several other announced first-party titles, including the Pokémon Go Plus device that would work alongside the upcoming mobile game, Ever Oasis, Mario Party: Star Rush, Paper Mario: Color Splash, BoxBoxBoy!, and Rhythm Heaven Megamix, which was released that day on Nintendo's eShop. It also featured other third-party games that would appear on the Nintendo 3DS, including Monster Hunter Generations, Dragon Quest VII: Fragments of the Forgotten Past, and Yo-kai Watch 2.

Nintendo made the unorthodox decision to not present the then-unrevealed Nintendo Switch (at this point still known as by its codename, "NX") at E3 2016, despite the console being due for an early 2017 release. At a shareholders meeting following E3, Shigeru Miyamoto stated that this was due to concerns of competitors copying from it if they revealed it too soon. Nintendo's presence on the show floor was devoted exclusively to Breath of the Wild.

List of notable exhibitors
Several major exhibitors who had attended the previous E3 exhibitions were not present. Activision opted to forgo a booth at the show, instead featuring their upcoming games through other publishers that would be there, such as allowing Sony to showcase Call of Duty: Infinite Warfare. Electronic Arts opted to hold their EA Play event separate from E3, and forgo any floor space at the show. Both Disney Interactive Studios (which ceased to operate as an independent developer effective May 2016) and Wargaming opted to not present in the event.

The following is a partial list of vendors that had exhibitions during the convention:

 Bethesda Softworks
 Deep Silver
 Electronic Arts
 Focus Home Interactive
 Koei Tecmo
 Microsoft Studios
 Nintendo
 Sega
 Sony Interactive Entertainment
 Square Enix
 Take-Two Interactive
 Ubisoft

List of featured games
This is a list of notable titles that appeared at E3 2016.

Game Critics Awards
Following the Expo, journalists from over 40 different publications assembled and subsequently voted on games across various categories as their Best of E3 awards. The nominees were announced on June 29, 2016, and the winners on July 5, 2016.

In addition to the awards below, God of War received a "Special Commendation for Graphics".

Into the Pixel Exhibition
The Into the Pixel exhibition, a collaboration between the Entertainment Software Association and the Academy of Interactive Arts & Sciences on display during E3, featured selected art that "push the interactive entertainment art form forward". The exhibit included selected concept art, in-game assets, and screenshots, from existing and upcoming games chosen from artist-submitted entries by a small jury. The fourteen games selected in 2016 include:

E3 Live
In prior years, there has been pressure on the ESA, the organizers of E3, to admit members of the public to the event. E3 is normally closed only to members of the video game industry and the media. As the video game industry is strongly driven by consumers and avid gamers, E3 has been criticized for denying them access to the event. In 2015, the ESA allocated 5000 tickets among the various floor exhibitors that they could give to fans to attend the expo.

For E3 2016, the ESA planned a separate three-day E3 Live event held from June 14–16, 2016 alongside the main E3 event for members of the public at L.A. Live, which neighbors the Convention Center. The event was free but required ticket reservations. E3 Live was promoted with the opportunity for its attendees to try the games and meet with members of the industry and selected company representatives, along with musical performances. This is the first time that E3 offered any opportunity for the public at large to attend the E3 event. According to ESA's Mike Gallagher, the intent of E3 Live was to provide to gamers that were not part of the industry "the chance to test-drive exciting new games, interact with some of their favorite developers, and be among the first in the world to enjoy groundbreaking game experiences".

The EA Live event drew about 20,000 people. According to James Brightman for GamesIndustry.biz, the event was underwhelming compared to what had been described, with only a few display areas among a small area. He spoke to those that attended who shared the same sentiment, that the promotion of the E3 Live event suggested there would be much more present.

Notes

References

2016 in Los Angeles
2016 in video gaming
2016
June 2016 events in the United States